HK First is a localist political party in Hong Kong. It had one representative in the Legislative Council of Hong Kong, Claudia Mo, a former pan-democratic Civic Party member. It was founded in 2013 by two pro-democracy legislators, Claudia Mo and Gary Fan, to "defend the city's culture from 'mainlandisation'".

History 
The group was formed on 31 January 2013 by the two pan-democratic legislators, Claudia Mo of the Civic Party and Gary Fan of Neo Democrats who shared sympathy with the growing localist sentiment in Hong Kong. It claims to "help safeguard not only Hong Kong's high degree of autonomy, but also its lifestyle as guaranteed unchanged for 50 years under one country, two systems and stipulated in the Basic Law".

It concerns the cultural aspects of the Hong Kong lifestyle, including the use of traditional Chinese characters, Cantonese and traditional phonetic translation between English and Cantonese, in which many localists deemed to be under "invasion" of the mainland China's simplified Chinese, Mandarin Chinese and its phonetic translation. It also opposed the influxes of mainland tourists, grey goods traders, Mainland schools children who were seen as taken away the quota of the local students, panic-buying of baby formula and various social issues in related to Hong Kong–Mainland conflict. Despite its localist agenda, the group does not advocate for Hong Kong independence as compared to many other localists. It opposed the government's Individual Visit Scheme to limit the number of mainland tourists. They co-sponsored a controversial ad which claimed that reducing immigration would help the people of Hong Kong to get to the bottom of the housing problem, while rejecting claims of bias or discrimination against mainlanders, despite condemnation from the Equal Opportunities Commission. Fan later introduced a motion on adhering to the need to "put Hong Kong people first" in formulating policies, but the motion was ultimately defeated.

Gary Fan ran in the 2012 Legislative Council election with a "moderate" localist agenda in the New Territories East while Claudia Mo ran in Kowloon West with the slogan of "against mainlandisation". The two ran again in the 2016 Legislative Council election, in which Fan lost in the ferocious competition in New Territories East and left the group only one representative. In November 2016, Mo announced her resignation from the Civic Party, citing her differences with the party on matters especially localism. She said she would continue serving the legislature as an "independent democrat" under the label "HK First".

References

External links

2013 establishments in Hong Kong
Liberal parties in Hong Kong
Localist parties in Hong Kong
Political parties established in 2013
Political parties in Hong Kong
Pro-democracy camp (Hong Kong)